was a major general and a division commander in the Imperial Japanese Army (IJA) during World War II.

Biography
A native of Tochigi Prefecture, Nasu graduated from the 25th class of the Imperial Japanese Army Academy in 1913 and from the 35th class of the Army Staff College in 1923. He served in various staff positions within the Imperial Japanese Army General Staff, and was assigned to the Taiwan Army of Japan in 1917. In 1935 he served on the staff of the Kwantung Army and participated in Operation Chahar. Nasu was promoted to major general in 1940, and became commander of the IJA 3rd Infantry Brigade.

Nasu commanded a detachment (named after him) during the Battle of Java in the Dutch East Indies campaign. Landing on March 1, 1942, the detachment rapidly progressed across Western Java, facing its heaviest resistance in the Battle of Leuwiliang against primarily Australian troops commanded by Arthur Blackburn.

During the Guadalcanal campaign Nasu landed on Guadalcanal with the IJA 2nd Division during the first week of October 1942 in response to the Allied landings on the island. Nasu commanded one of the 2nd Division's large infantry groups, comprising infantry battalions from several regiments during the resulting October Matanikau action and Battle for Henderson Field. On October 25, 1942, while leading his troops against United States positions, Nasu was mortally wounded by rifle fire and died early the next morning.

He was posthumously promoted to lieutenant general.

References

Bibliography

1892 births
1942 deaths
Military personnel from Tochigi Prefecture
Japanese military personnel of World War II
Japanese generals
Japanese military personnel killed in World War II
Deaths by firearm